Jonathan H. Turner (born September 7, 1942), is a professor of sociology at University of California, Riverside.

Biography 
After receiving his PhD from Cornell University in 1968, since the academic year 1969–1970 he has been at UCR. He has been Faculty Research Lecturer at UCR, and in the profession, he has been president of the Pacific Sociological Association and California Sociological Association. He is also a Fellow of the American Association for the Advancement of Science. He has lectured widely all over the world, and he has been a visiting professor at Cambridge University, UK, Universitat Bremen, Germany, Universitat Bielefeld, Germany, Shandong University and Nankai University, People's Republic at China.

He is known as a general theorist of sociology, although he has a number of specialties: the sociology of emotions, ethnic relations, social institutions, social stratification, and bio-sociology.

Turner was awarded the 2008 Outstanding Recent Contribution Award by the American Sociological Association alongside co-author Jan E. Stets for their book Handbook of the Sociology of Emotions.

Selected bibliography 
Turner is an author of forty-one books, including textbooks, and well over two hundred articles.

 
 
 
 
 
 
 
 
 
 
 
 
 
 
 
 
 Turner, Jonathan H., Alexandra Maryanski, Anders K. Petersen, and Armin Geertz (2018) The Emergence and Evolution of Religion: By Means of Natural Selection. New York and London: Routledge
 Turner, Jonathan H. and Richard Machalek (2018). The New Evolutionary Sociology: Recent and Revitalized Theoretical and Methodological Approaches. New York and London: Routledge.

References

External links
Homepage at UCRiverside

1942 births
American sociologists
Cornell University alumni
Living people
University of California, Riverside faculty
Fellows of the American Association for the Advancement of Science